Kerala Estate  is a village near Karuvarakundu and Kalikavu in Malappuram district in the state of Kerala, India.

Demographics
 India census, Kerala Estate had a population of 10299 with 4901 males and 5398 females.

Transportation
Keralaestate village connects to other parts of India through Nilambur town.  State Highway No.28 starts from Nilambur and connects to Ooty, Mysore and Bangalore through Highways.12,29 and 181. National highway No.66 passes through Ramanattukara and the northern stretch connects to Goa and Mumbai.  The southern stretch connects to Cochin and Trivandrum.   State.  The nearest airport is at Kozhikode.  The nearest major railway station is at Feroke.

References

Villages in Malappuram district
Nilambur area